Peter Katona (born 12 April 1988 in Prešov) is a Slovak football midfielder who currently plays for TJ ŠM Dulová Ves.

Career

Coaching career

External links
Tatran profile 

Player profile at wspsoccer.com

1988 births
Living people
Sportspeople from Prešov
Slovak footballers
Association football midfielders
1. FC Tatran Prešov players
MŠK Rimavská Sobota players
Partizán Bardejov players
Slovak Super Liga players
2. Liga (Slovakia) players